Lom nad Volčo is a small settlement above Volča in the Municipality of Gorenja Vas–Poljane in the Upper Carniola region of Slovenia.

Name
The name of the settlement was changed from Lom to Lom nad Volčo in 1953.

References

External links 

Lom nad Volčo on Geopedia

Populated places in the Municipality of Gorenja vas-Poljane